Soldiers Live is the ninth novel in Glen Cook's ongoing series, The Black Company.  The series combines elements of epic fantasy and dark fantasy as it follows an elite mercenary unit, The Black Company, through roughly forty years of its approximately four hundred year history.

Plot summary
Croaker, no longer dictator of Taglios or Captain of the Company, resumes his old role as Annalist. Sleepy is now Captain, and no Black Company member has died in battle for four years. But when the Company's old adversaries try to bring about the apocalyptic Year of the Skulls, the Company is brought to the edge of destruction.

Characters in "Soldiers Live"

 Croaker
 Lady
 Sleepy
 Tobo
 Shukrat
 Arkana
 The Daughter of the Night (Booboo)
 Goblin
 Shivetya (the demon)
 One-Eye
 Murgen

External links
 
 

Novels by Glen Cook
2000 American novels
American fantasy novels
Tor Books books